Secondary is a term used in organic chemistry to classify various types of compounds (e. g. alcohols, alkyl halides, amines) or reactive intermediates (e. g. alkyl radicals, carbocations). An atom is considered secondary if it has two 'R' Groups attached to it. An 'R' group is a carbon containing group such as a methyl (CH3 ). A secondary compound is most often classified on an alpha carbon (middle carbon) or a nitrogen. The word secondary comes from the root word 'second' which means two. 

This nomenclature can be used in many cases and further used to explain relative reactivity. The reactivity of molecules varies with respect to the attached atoms. Thus, a primary, secondary, tertiary and quaternary molecule of the same function group will have different reactivities.

Secondary Alcohols 
Secondary alcohols are identified by the groups attached to the central carbon that is bonding with the alcohol (-OH) group. A secondary alcohol is a carbon with four substituents including a single hydrogen, two 'R' groups, and one hydroxyl/alcohol (-OH) group. If one of the carbons the hydroxyl group is attached to is allylic or benzylic, the alcohol can also be referred to as a secondary allylic or benzylic alcohol.

Secondary Alcohols and Reactions 
When a molecule undergoes a chemical process in which it loses electrons or gains an additional bond with an oxygen atom, this is considered oxidation. The oxidation of secondary alcohols often gives rise to ketones, which is an oxygen double bonded to two 'R' groups. Alcohols participate in many other chemical reactions including: dehydration, substitution and esterification. The reactivity of alcohols increases as the carbon becomes more saturated with 'R' groups. Saturation refers to bond order and number of bonds with a more saturated molecule having more single bonds to 'R' groups. Thus, secondary alcohols are more reactive than primary but less reactive than tertiary. Alcohols are characterized by having a hydroxyl group; hydroxyl (-OH) groups are very polar groups because of the high electronegativity seen on the oxygen.

Secondary Amines 
A secondary amine contain a middle nitrogen that bonds with a single hydrogen and two 'R' groups. These 'R' groups can be carbon containing molecules or any other atoms excluding hydrogen. Nitrogen by nature has five valence electrons and thus will have three bonds and one lone pair to allow for a full octet. This explains why now we only see three bonds to the nitrogen as seen below, unlike the secondary alcohol that had four bonds to the middle carbon.

Secondary Amines and Reactions 
Secondary amines are involved in many reactions. They can participate in reactions with aldehydes or ketones to give carbinolamines then allowing dehydration to give the enamine.  Secondary amines are considered weak acids with a conjugate base of an amide. Similarly to alcohols, secondary amines are more reactive than primary amines but less reactive than tertiary or quaternary.

Secondary Amides 
An amide is a group in which a nitrogen is directly attached to a Carbon with a double bonded oxygen. Specifically, a secondary amide is seen when the nitrogen to another additional 'R' carbon containing molecule. The third bond is from the middle nitrogen to a single hydrogen atom as shown below. A secondary amide is very similar to a secondary amine as it has a middle nitrogen, one hydrogen bond, two more substituents, and a single lone pair on the nitrogen.

Secondary Amides and Reactions 
Amides are generally weak bases and can partake in several reactions. Specifically, secondary amides participate in reactions such as tautomeric equilibria with thioamides, ortho lithiation. They also do simple reactions such as de-protonation events using a strong base, which is the loss of the single proton bonded to the middle nitrogen.

Secondary Phosphines 
Secondary phosphines have two 'R' groups attached to a middle phosphorus atom and again, a single hydrogen bond. When in a catalytic environment, secondary phosphines are unstable, this limits them from being used in homogeneous catalysis. 

Secondary is a general term used in chemistry that can be applied to many molecules, even more than the ones listed here; the principles seen in these examples can be further applied to other functional group containing molecules. The ones shown above are common molecules seen in many organic reactions. By classifying a molecule as secondary it then be compared with a molecule of primary or tertiary nature to determine the relative reactivity.

See also 
 Primary (chemistry)
 Tertiary (chemistry)
 Quaternary (chemistry)

References 

Chemical nomenclature